The Algar–Flynn–Oyamada reaction is a chemical reaction whereby a chalcone undergoes an oxidative cyclization to form a flavonol.

Reaction mechanism
There are several possible mechanisms to explain this reaction; however, these reaction mechanisms have not been elucidated. What is known is that a two-stage mechanism exists. First, dihydroflavonol is formed, which then subsequently oxidizes to form a flavonol.

Those mechanisms which have an epoxide to be an intermediate are excluded, which should be obtained by the oxidation of the double bond with hydrogen peroxide in Prileschajew reaction. Gormley et al. have shown that the reaction does not proceed through an epoxide.
 
The probable mechanisms are thus two possibilities:
 The attack of nucleophiles by base phenolates educated at the double bond under direct attack on the hydrogen peroxide.
 Nucleophiles attack phenolates under the formation of an enolate, which then attacks on hydrogen peroxide.

See also
 Allan–Robinson reaction
 Auwers synthesis

References

Heterocycle forming reactions
Organic redox reactions
Name reactions